Gary Rhett Shearston (9 January 19391 July 2013) was an Australian singer and songwriter and Anglican priest. He was a leading figure of the folk music revival of the 1960s and was notable as a performer of Australian traditional folk songs in an authentic style. He scored a Top 10 hit in the United Kingdom in 1974 with his cover version of the Cole Porter song "I Get a Kick out of You".

Early life
Shearston was born in Inverell, New South Wales, Australia, the son of Audrey Lilian (née Manchee) and James Barclay Shearston. During World War II his father was posted on active service and Shearston and his mother lived on his grandparents' property, "Ayrdrie", near Tenterfield, New South Wales. At the age of 11 his family moved to Sydney and he attended his father's alma mater, Newington College (1950–1955), commencing as a preparatory school student at Wyvern House.

Working life
Shearston trained as press correspondent with United Press and his first show business job was with the Tintookies, an Australian travelling puppet show. He joined the Hayes Gordon Ensemble Theatre working as an actor and stage manager.

Music career
Having taken up guitar, Shearston learned a repertoire of English, American and Australian folk songs and at 19 become a professional singer. He worked in hotels and sang at The Folksinger and with the American gospel and blues singer Brother John Sellers. In 1962 Shearston signed with Leedon Records and the following year was signed to the Australian division of CBS Records by A&R manager Sven Libaek. In March 1965 Sydney radio stations started playing a track from his album Australian Broadside. His single "Sydney Town" (written by the author Frank Hardy) hit the Top 10 in his home city. In 1966 and 1967, he became Australia's biggest record seller of folk music. He had his own national television show called Just Folk and Peter Paul and Mary recorded a cover of his "Sometime Lovin'". They also invited him to go to the United States. He spent a year in London and then four years on the east coast of the United States. In 1972 he returned to England and rerecorded some songs for the album Dingo. The song which attracted most attention was his deadpan interpretation of Cole Porter's "I Get a Kick out of You". In 1990 he received the Tamworth Songwriters' Association's Bush Ballad of the Year award for the autobiographical song "Shopping on a Saturday".

Church ministry
Shearston returned to Australia in 1989 and later became a cleric in the Anglican Church of Australia in rural New South Wales. He was ordained a deacon in 1991 and a priest in 1992. He served as an assistant in Narrandera (1991) and Deniliquin (1992-1993). He was priest-in-charge in Hay (1993-1998), rector of Bangalow (1998-2003) and a locum in Stanthorpe (2005-2006) and Coleambally-Darlington Point/Deniliquin (2006).

Death
Shearston died on 1 July 2013, aged 74 years, at Armidale Hospital in New South Wales after earlier in the day suffering a stroke at his home, "Ayrdrie", near Tenterfield.

Discography

Albums
 Folk Songs & Ballads of Australia (CBS 1964)
 Songs of our Time (CBS 1964)
 Australian Broadside (CBS 1965)
 The Springtime It Brings On The Shearing (CBS 1965)
 Bolters, Bushrangers & Duffers (CBS 1965)
 Sings His Songs (CBS 1966)
 Abreaction (On a Bitumen Road With Soft Edges) (Festival 1967)
 Dingo (Charisma 1974) AUS #31
 The Greatest Stone On Earth and Other Two-Bob Wonders (Charisma 1975)
 Aussie Blue (Larrikin 1989)
 Only Love Survives (Rouseabout 2001)
 Here & There, Now & Then Anthology 1964-2001 (Rouseabout 2007)
 Best of all Trades (Rouseabout 2009)
 Renegade (Rouseabout 2011)
 The Great Australian Groove (Rouseabout 2012)
 Reverently (Restless Music 2013)
 Hills of Assisi (Restless Music 2013)
 Pathways of a Celtic Land (Restless Music 2013)

Singles

Awards

Tamworth Songwriters Awards
The Tamworth Songwriters Association (TSA) is an annual songwriting contest for original country songs, awarded in January at the Tamworth Country Music Festival. They commenced in 1986.
 (wins only)
|-
| 1990
| "Shopping on a Saturday" by Gary Shearston
| Traditional Bush Ballad of the Year
| 
|-

See also
List of Old Newingtonians
List of performers on Top of the Pops

References

External links

Official website
Review of Best of All Trades, double CD set 2009 (Simply Australia)
Howlspace article
Pop Archives – I Get A Kick Out of You feature 
Undercover Music
Sydney Morning Herald album review, 2007
Three Early Recordings of Gary Shearston: A Personal Reflection (Jim Low)
Moments of Synchronicity with Gary Shearston (Jim Low)
Obituary in The Guardian  
Gary Shearston's Restless Recordings  

1939 births
2013 deaths
Australian folk singers
People educated at Newington College
20th-century Australian musicians
Charisma Records artists
Transatlantic Records artists